

Current listings

|}

Former listing

|}

References

 
Walla Walla